The Taedok Science Town Monorail is a monorail in Daejeon, built for the Taejŏn Expo '93.  It still operates today as a tourist attraction.  It has eight-car trains running around a loop.

References

Monorails in South Korea
Daejeon
Railway lines opened in 1993
Tourist attractions in Daejeon